The Roman Catholic Diocese of Esteli (erected 17 December 1962) is a suffragan of the Archdiocese of Managua.

Ordinaries
Clemente Carranza y López (12 January 1963 – 7 February 1978)
Rubén López Ardón (2 January 1979 – 6 March 1990)
Juan Abelardo Mata Guevara, S.D.B. (6 March 1990 – 6 July 2021)

External links and references

Esteli
Esteli
Esteli
Estelí